Chrysogonus was an intimate friend and devoted servant of Philip V, King of Macedon from 221 to 179 BC. He was employed by Philip both in war and in peace, and possessed great influence with the king, which he seems to have exercised in an honourable manner, for Polybius says that Philip was most merciful when he followed the advice of Chrysogonus. He was also the father of poet Samus executed by Philip V.

References

Antigonid generals
3rd-century BC Greek people
2nd-century BC Greek people